Highlands North is a suburb of Johannesburg, South Africa. It is located in Johannesburg Region E. It is a small suburb surrounded by the suburbs of Oaklands, Waverly, Glenhazel and Orchards.

History
The suburb was laid out in 1903. Its name may originate either from the name of the land developer called the Highlands Township Syndicate and an alternative to another suburb called Highlands or just reflects a similar name to the other Scottish named suburbs that lie around it.

References

Johannesburg Region E